Racing Blood refers to the following films:

 Racing Blood (1926 film), an American silent film
 Racing Blood (1936 film), an American film
 Racing Blood (1954 film), an American film